Javier Manuel Hernandez Jr. (born February 20, 1978), known professionally as Jay Hernandez, is an American actor and fashion model. After making his television debut in NBC's Hang Time, he made his film debut opposite Kirsten Dunst in the romantic drama Crazy/Beautiful (2001). He has since starred in numerous films, including Friday Night Lights (2004), Hostel (2005), Bad Moms (2016), and as Chato Santana / El Diablo in Suicide Squad (2016). Since 2018, he has played Thomas Magnum in the reboot of Magnum P.I.

Early life
Hernandez was born in Montebello, California, the son of Isis (née Maldonado), a secretary and accountant, and Javier Hernandez Sr., a mechanic. He has a younger sister, Amelia, and two older brothers, Michael and Gabriel. He met his wife, actress Daniella Deutscher, when he was 14 years old and she was 17. He attended Don Bosco Technical Institute in Rosemead, California, but transferred to Schurr High School in Montebello for his senior year. While riding an elevator in a high-rise in Los Angeles, he was approached by talent manager Howard Tyner who suggested he had what it took to have a successful career in Hollywood. He enrolled Hernandez into acting school and sent his pictures to casting agents.

Career
From 1998 to 2000 Hernandez played Antonio Lopez on the NBC series Hang Time. His name break came with his role opposite Kirsten Dunst in the 2001Touchstone Pictures feature Crazy/Beautiful. He has since appeared in several major Hollywood films, including lead roles in Carlito's Way: Rise to Power, the 2005 horror film Hostel and World Trade Center. He appeared in the action/crime film Takers (2010).

He appeared in the 2005 crime prequel Carlito's Way: Rise to Power as Carlito Brigante, the role originated by Al Pacino in the 1993 film of the same name.

Hernandez portrayed Paxton in Eli Roth's Hostel (2005) and its 2007 sequel, Hostel: Part II.

In 2015, he appeared in Max as a US military sergeant assigned with the titular rescue dog, which was traumatized by his previous handler's death.

In 2016, he starred as Jessie Harkness in the comedy film Bad Moms, and as metahuman ex-gangster El Diablo in the superhero film Suicide Squad.

On February 20, 2018, Hernandez was cast as Thomas Magnum in CBS drama series Magnum P.I. reboot. It premiered on September 24, 2018. After four seasons, it was canceled in May 2022, before being rescued by NBC with a two-season order that June.

Personal life
In 2006, Hernandez married his former Hang Time co-star Daniella Deutscher.

Filmography

Film

Television

Awards and nominations

References

External links

Male actors from California
American male film actors
American male actors of Mexican descent
American male television actors
American male voice actors
Don Bosco Technical Institute alumni
1978 births
Living people
People from Montebello, California
20th-century American male actors
21st-century American male actors
Hispanic and Latino American male actors